The 1660 destruction of Tiberias occurred during the Druze power struggle in the Galilee, in the same year as the destruction of Safed. The destruction of Tiberias by the Druze resulted in abandonment of the city by its Jewish community, until it was rebuilt by Zahir al-Umar in early eighteenth century. Altshuler however attributes the destruction of Tiberias in 1660 to an earthquake. The destruction could have also been a combination of both events.

Tiberias in the sixteenth century
As the Ottoman Empire expanded along the southern Mediterranean coast under sultan Selim I, the Catholic Monarchs began establishing Inquisition commissions. Many Conversos, (Marranos and Moriscos) and Sephardi Jews fled to the Ottoman provinces, settling at first in Constantinople, Salonika, Sarajevo, Sofia and Anatolia. The Sultan encouraged them to settle in Palestine. In 1558, a Portuguese-born marrano, Doña Gracia, was granted tax collecting rights in Tiberias and its surrounding villages by Suleiman the Magnificent. She envisaged the town becoming a refuge for Jews and obtained a permit to establish Jewish autonomy there. In 1561 her nephew Joseph Nasi, the Sultan-appointed Lord of Tiberias, encouraged Jews to settle in Tiberias. Securing a firman from the Sultan, he and Joseph ben Adruth rebuilt the city walls and laid the groundwork for a  textile (silk) industry, planting mulberry trees and urging craftsmen to move there. In 1624, when the Sultan recognized Fakhr-al-Din II as Lord of Arabistan (from Aleppo to the borders of Egypt), the Druze leader made Tiberias his capital.

The 1660 destruction
The destruction of Tiberias by the Druze resulted in the Jewish community fleeing entirely. Unlike Tiberias, which became desolate for many years, the nearby city of Safed recovered from its destruction by Arabs in 1660 relatively quickly, not becoming entirely abandoned, remaining an important Jewish center in the Galilee.

Aftermath
In the 1720s, Zahir al-Umar a Bedouin ruler of Ottoman Galilee, fortified the town of Tiberias and signed an agreement with the neighboring Bedouin tribes to prevent looting. Richard Pococke, who visited Tiberias in 1738, witnessed the building of a fort to the north of the city, and the strengthening of the old walls, attributing it to a dispute with the pasha (ruler) of Damascus. Under Zahir's patronage, Jewish families were encouraged to settle in Tiberias. He invited Chaim Abulafia of Smyrna to rebuild the Jewish community.

See also
1660 destruction of Safed
History of the Jews and Judaism in the Land of Israel

References

Antisemitism in the Ottoman Empire
Anti-Jewish pogroms by Muslims
Jews and Judaism in Ottoman Galilee
1660 in Ottoman Syria
Tiberias
Druze in the Ottoman Empire